Gourcuff or Gourkuñv also associated to Corcuff is a surname, and may refer to;

Gourkuñv derives from gour and kuñv which means a charming, affable, gentle or conciliatory man in Breton. Like for the surname Henaff, the digraph -ff was introduced by Middle Ages' authors to indicate a nasalized vowel.

 Yoann Gourcuff, French footballer
 Christian Gourcuff, French football coach
 Guillaume de Gourcuff, Breton noble who participated in the Sixth Crusade. His name is mentioned in the third Salle des Croisades.
 Marguerite de Gourcuff a.k.a. Daisy de Galard, French journalist
 Olivier de Gourcuff, French writer
 Laurent de Gourcuff, French businessman

References

Breton-language surnames